List of the published work of Joyce Carol Oates, American writer.

Novels
 With Shuddering Fall (1964)
 A Garden of Earthly Delights (1967)
 Expensive People (1968)
 Them (1969)
 Wonderland (1971)
 Do With Me What You Will (1973)
 The Assassins (1975)
 Childwold (1976)
 Son of the Morning (1978)
 Cybele (1979)
 Unholy Loves (1979)
 Bellefleur (1980)
 Angel of Light (1981)
 A Bloodsmoor Romance (1982)
 Mysteries of Winterthurn (1984)
 Solstice (1985)
 Marya: A Life (1986)
 You Must Remember This (1987)
 American Appetites (1989)
 Because It Is Bitter, and Because It Is My Heart (1990)
 Foxfire: Confessions of a Girl Gang (1993) (the basis for the 1996 film Foxfire)
 What I Lived For (1994)
 Zombie (1995)
 We Were the Mulvaneys (1996)
 Man Crazy (1997)
 My Heart Laid Bare (1998)
 Broke Heart Blues (1999)
 Blonde (2000)
 Middle Age: A Romance (2001)
 I'll Take You There (2002)
 The Tattooed Girl (2003)
 The Falls (2004)
 Missing Mom (2005)
 Black Girl / White Girl (2006)
 The Gravedigger's Daughter (2007)
 My Sister, My Love (2008)
 Little Bird of Heaven (2009)
 Mudwoman (2012)
 Daddy Love (2013)
 The Accursed (2013)
 Carthage (2014)
 The Sacrifice (2015)
 Jack of Spades (2015)
 The Man Without a Shadow (2016)
 A Book of American Martyrs (2017)
 Hazards of Time Travel (2018)
 My Life As a Rat (2019)
 The Pursuit (2019)
 Night. Sleep. Death. The Stars. (2020)
 Breathe (2021)
 Babysitter (2022)
 48 Clues into the Disappearance of My Sister (To be published March 14, 2023)

As Rosamond Smith
 Lives of the Twins (1987) (U.K. title: Kindred Passions)
 Soul/Mate (1989)
 Nemesis (1990)
 Snake Eyes (1992)
 You Can't Catch Me (1995)
 Double Delight (1997)
 Starr Bright Will Be With you Soon (1999)
 The Barrens (2001)

As Lauren Kelly

 Take Me, Take Me With You (2004)
 The Stolen Heart (2005)
 Blood Mask (2006)

Short fiction

Collections
 By the North Gate (1963)
 Upon the Sweeping Flood and Other Stories (1966)
 The Wheel of Love and Other Stories (1970)
 Marriages and Infidelities (1972)
 The Goddess and Other Women (1974)
 The Hungry Ghosts: Seven Allusive Comedies (1974)
 Where Are You Going, Where Have You Been?: Stories of Young America (1974)
 The Poisoned Kiss and Other Stories from the Portuguese (1975)
 The Seduction and Other Stories (1975)
 Crossing the Border (1976)
 Night-Side (1977)
 All the Good People I've Left Behind (1979) 
 A Sentimental Education (1980) 
 Last Days: Stories (1984) 
 Wild Saturday (1984)
 Raven's Wing (1986) 
 The Assignation (1988)
 Oates in Exile (1990) 
 Heat & Other Stories (1991)
 Where is Here? (1992)
 Where Are You Going, Where Have You Been?: Selected Early Stories (1993)
 Haunted: Tales of the Grotesque (1994)
 Demon and Other Tales (1996)
 Will You Always Love Me? And Other Stories (1996)
 The Collector of Hearts: New Tales of the Grotesque (1998)
 Faithless: Tales of Transgression (2001)
 I Am No One You Know: Stories (2004)
 The Female of the Species: Tales of Mystery and Suspense (2006)
 High Lonesome: New & Selected Stories, 1966-2006 (2006)
 The Museum of Dr. Moses: Tales of Mystery and Suspense (2007)
 Wild Nights! (2008)
 Dear Husband (2009)
 Sourland: Stories (2010)
 Give Me Your Heart: Tales of Mystery and Suspense (2011)
 The Corn Maiden and Other Nightmares (2011)
 Black Dahlia & White Rose (2012)
 Evil Eye: Four Novellas of Love Gone Wrong (2013)
 High Crime Area: Tales of Darkness and Dread (2014) 
 Lovely, Dark, Deep (2014)
 The Doll-Master and Other Tales of Terror (2016)
 DIS MEM BER and Other Stories of Mistery and Suspense (2017)
 Beautiful Days (2018)
 Night-Gaunts and Other Tales of Suspense (2018)
 The Ruins of Contracoeur and Other Presences (2021)
 The (Other) You (2021)
 Night, Neon: Tales of Mystery and Suspense (2021)
 Extenuating Circumstances (2022)
 Zero-Sum: Stories (To be published July 18, 2023)

Novellas

 The Triumph of the Spider Monkey (1976)
 I Lock My Door Upon Myself (1990)
 The Rise of Life on Earth (1991)
 Black Water (1992)
 First Love: A Gothic Tale (Illustrated by Barry Moser) (1996)
 Beasts (2002)
 Rape: A Love Story (2003)
 The Corn Maiden: A Love Story (2005)
 A Fair Maiden (2010)
 Patricide (2012)
 The Rescuer (2012)
 Cardiff, by the Sea: Four Novellas of Suspense (2020)

Uncollected short stories

Young adult fiction

 Big Mouth & Ugly Girl (2002)
 Small Avalanches and Other Stories (2003)
 Freaky Green Eyes (2003)
 Sexy (2005)
 After the Wreck, I Picked Myself Up, Spread My Wings, and Flew Away (2006)
 Two or Three Things I Forgot to Tell You (2012)

Children's fiction

 Come Meet Muffin! (1998)
 Great Ghost Stories (1998) (compiled by Peter Glassman, illustrated by Barry Moser)
 Where Is Little Reynard? (2003)
 Naughty Chérie! (2008)

Drama

 Miracle Play (1974)
 Three Plays (1980)
 Tone Clusters (1990)
 In Darkest America (1991)
 I Stand Before You Naked (1991)
 Twelve Plays (1991) (including Black)
 The Perfectionist and Other Plays (1995)
 New Plays (1998)
 Dr. Magic: Six One Act Plays (2004)

Essays and memoirs

 The Hostile Sun: The Poetry of D.H. Lawrence (1973)
 New Heaven, New Earth: The Visionary Experience in Literature (1974)
 The Picture of Dorian Gray: Wilde’s Parable of the Fall (1980)
 Contraries: Essays (1981)
 The Profane Art: Essays & Reviews (1983)
 On Boxing (with John Ranard, photographer) (1987)
 (Woman) Writer: Occasions and Opportunities (1988)
 George Bellows: American Artist (1995)
 They Just Went Away (1995)
 Where I've Been, And Where I'm Going: Essays, Reviews, and Prose (1999)
 "A Fragmented Diary in a Fragmented Time" (2003) published in Narrative Magazine
 The Faith of A Writer: Life, Craft, Art (2003)
 Uncensored: Views & (Re)views (2005)
 The Journal of Joyce Carol Oates: 1973-1982 (2007)
 In the Absence of Mentors/Monsters (2009)
 In Rough Country (2010)
 A Widow's Story: A Memoir (2011) 
 Joyce Carol Oates creates Evangeline Fife, who interviews Robert Frost: Lovely, Dark, Deep (2013) published in "Dead Interviews" 

 The Lost Landscape: A Writer's Coming of Age (2015)
 "Nighthawk: Recollections of a Lost Time" (2015) published in Narrative Magazine
 "The Lost Sister: An Elegy" (2015) published in Narrative Magazine
 Soul at the White Heat: Inspiration, Obsession, and the Writing Life (2016)

Poetry

Collections
 Women in Love and Other Poems (1968)
 Anonymous Sins & Other Poems (1969)
 Love and Its Derangements (1970)
 Angel Fire (1973)
 Dreaming America (1973)
 The Fabulous Beasts (1975)
 Season of Peril (1977)
 Women Whose Lives Are Food, Men Whose Lives Are Money (1978)
 Invisible Woman: New and Selected Poems, 1970–1982 (1982)
 The Time Traveler (1989)
 Tenderness (1996)
 American Melancholy: Poems (2021)

List of poems

Book reviews

References

External links
 The Glass Ark: A Joyce Carol Oates Bibliography (Official Web Site)

Bibliographies by writer
Bibliographies of American writers